Nambaryn Enkhbayar (born 1 June 1958) is a Mongolian politician. He served as the Prime Minister of Mongolia from 2000 to 2004, as Speaker of the Parliament from 2004 to 2005, and as President of Mongolia from 2005 to 2009. He is the first person to have held all of the top three positions in the Mongolian government. He was the chairman of the Mongolian People’s Party from 1997 to 2005 and head of Mongolian People's Revolutionary Party from 2010 to 2021. His eldest son, Batshugar Enkhbayar is a member of the State Great Khural from Mongolian People's Party.

Early life and education
Nambaryn Enkhbayar was born on 1 June 1958 in Ulaanbaatar, Mongolia. He finished a secondary school in 1975, and earned an undergraduate degree majoring in literature and language studies from Maxim Gorky Literature Institute in Moscow, Russia in 1980. He studied at an English language and literature course at Leeds University in the United Kingdom in 1985–1986. As a young man, he translated the works of Mongolian poet Mend-Ooyo Gombojav into English. Enkhbayar became the chairman of the Association of Mongolian Writers in 1990. He is married to Onongiin Tsolmon since 1987 and they have four children.

Legislative career
In 1992, as a member of the Mongolian People's Revolutionary Party (MPRP) Enkhbayar was elected to the State Great Khural (Mongolian Parliament). Mongolia voted to retain former communist MPRP during its first venture into democratic elections, and Enkhbayar was appointed to serve as the country's Minister of Culture. He held that post until 1996, when the Democratic Party ousted the MPRP in the parliamentary elections that year. In 1996 Enkhbayar became the secretary general of the MPRP and led the opposition MPRP group in the Parliament. In 1997 he was elected as the chairman of the MPRP.

Prime Minister
In 1999, the country was hit by one of its infamous zud spells, when summer draught and cold weather blizzards resulted in severe food shortages and loss of thousands of livestock. The government responded poorly to the disaster and the MPRP received an unexpected boost from the climatological disaster. Enkhbayar's leading MPRP won 2000 parliamentary elections winning 72 out of 76 seats. The MPRP controlling the parliament, Enkhbayar became the country's Prime Minister. He initiated an ambitious Millennium Road project to connect Mongolian territory from east to west. During Enkhbayar's time as Prime Minister, he successfully eliminated Mongolia's debt to the former Soviet Union, and this was the first time since the 1920s that Mongolia did not owe debt to its northern neighbor, while it was controversial debt due to Mongolia being a raw material supplier to Soviet Union pricing the materials almost free for former USSR. Thanks to international exposure of Mongolia's vast mineral resources, the economy experienced 10% real GDP growth in 2004.

Speaker of Parliament
In 2004, MPRP lost to Motherland Democratic Coalition-a coalition of Democratic Party and Motherland Party. Due to election result where none of the coalition and the MPRP became the enough majority to hold the government, grand coalition government was formed and Enkhbayar became the Speaker of the Parliament and served on this post in 2004–2005.

President
He won the 2005 presidential election and became the Mongolian President. He welcomed U.S. President George W. Bush who paid an official visit to Mongolia. It was the first visit of a U.S president to the country. Mongolia received US$285 million aid from the United States' Millennium Challenge Compact (MCC) which United States President George W. Bush signed with Enkhbayar in 2007.

In the 2009 Mongolian presidential election, incumbent President Enkhbayar was defeated by Tsakhiagiin Elbegdorj of Democratic Party. Elbegdorj won 51.21% of total votes while Enkhbayar got 47.41%. Thus Enkhbayar became the first Mongolian President to lose re-election.

New political party establishment
In 2010, Enkhbayar established a political party and named it Mongolian People's Revolutionary Party. The party received approval to use the previous name of the Mongolian People's Party from the Supreme Court of Mongolia on 26 June 2011.  Enkhbayar became the chairman of his established party.

Convicted of corruption
The Independent Authority Against Corruption (IAAC) arrested Enkhbayar at the dawn of 13 April 2012. The IAAC stated that it arrested Enkhbayar for questioning in a graft case involving the illegal privatization of a government-owned hotel because he never showed up for questioning.

Over 1000 members of Mongolian People's Revolutionary Party and Enkhbayar's supporters participated in Mongolian People's Revolutionary Party's organized demonstration demanding Enkhbayar's release on the same day of his arrest. On 4 May 2012, Enkhbayar announced a dry hunger strike demanding his release. He lost around 12 kilograms in 16 days. Amnesty International issued a statement demanding the Mongolian authority to respect human rights of Enkhbayar compatible to international standards. United Nations Secretary General Ban Ki Moon made a phone call to President Tsakhiagiin Elbegdorj expressing concern over Enkhbayar's health. Enkhbayar was released on bail on 14 May 2012. United States Senator Dianne Feinstein expressed to the U.S.Senate her pleasure for Enkhbayar's release on bail and said "For any democracy, due process and the rule of law are essential."

On 8 June 2012, the General Elections Committee (GEC) refused to register Enkhbayar as a candidate for the 2012 parliamentary elections in the MPRP party list listed as number one. It stated that the official documents sent from the Prosecutor's Office and Sukhbaatar District Court of Ulaanbaatar required the rejection of Enkhbayar's application pending the case. However, Enkhbayar and his lawyers argue that the incumbent president, Tsakhiagiin Elbegdorj, who took office in 2009, engineered the corruption case to keep him from running in the coming elections. They claim that the court gave them insufficient time to review the prosecutors' evidence and witness statements. The election authorities' denial of Enkhbayar's candidacy on 6 June, they say, violates his constitutional right to be considered innocent until proven guilty. According to a US-based independent trial observer, the five charges leveled against Enkhbayar seem overblown and unsubstantiated. One accuses him of misappropriating TV equipment that was intended for a Buddhist monastery. Another alleges that he illegally shipped eight copies of his autobiography to South Korea on a government plane.

On 2 August 2012, after a three-day trial Sukhbaatar District Court convicted Enkhbayar of corruption and sentenced to seven years of imprisonment, three of which was pardoned and then gave four years prison term and fined with over MNT 1.7 billion for misusing state properties and government power. Enkhbayar's sentence was reduced to two and a half year prison term without the fine by the Supreme Court of Mongolia-the highest court in Mongolia.

On 1 August 2013, President of Mongolia Tsakhiagiin Elbegdorj issued a decree to pardon Enkhbayar thus releasing him from the rest of his jail term effective on the decree date.

Sports
Enkhbayar climbed the highest peak in Mongolia, Khüiten Peak, with mountaineers of the Mongolian Mountaineering Federation and the Nepal Mountaineering Association on 23 June 2011.

Religion
Enkhbayar is a follower of Tibetan Buddhism. He translated several Buddhist texts into Mongolian.

Notes

|-

|-

|-

1958 births
Living people
Alumni of the University of Leeds
Mongolian Buddhists
Mongolian expatriates in the Soviet Union
Mongolian expatriates in the United Kingdom
Mongolian People's Party politicians
People from Ulaanbaatar
Presidents of Mongolia
Prime Ministers of Mongolia
Speakers of the State Great Khural
Mongolian politicians convicted of crimes
Maxim Gorky Literature Institute alumni
Heads of government who were later imprisoned
21st-century Mongolian politicians